Giulio Galletti was a Roman Catholic prelate who served as Bishop of Alessano (1555–1560).

Biography
On 7 January 1555, Giulio Galletti was appointed during the papacy of Pope Julius III as Bishop of Alessano. He served as Bishop of Alessano until his resignation in 1560. While bishop, he was the principal co-consecrator of Flavio Orsini, Bishop of Muro Lucano (1561), and Annibale Saraceni, Bishop of Lecce (1561).

References

External links and additional sources
 (for Chronology of Bishops) 
 (for Chronology of Bishops) 

16th-century Italian Roman Catholic bishops
Bishops appointed by Pope Julius III